Nikolay Nikolayevich Gusakov (May 14, 1934 – December 14, 1991) was a former Soviet nordic combined skier who won a bronze in the individual event at the 1960 Winter Olympics in Squaw Valley.
He also won the Nordic combined event at the Holmenkollen ski festival in 1961.

Gusakov trained at the Armed Forces sports society in Moscow and later in Leningrad. He was the first Soviet athlete to win an Olympic medal in the Nordic combined and the first one to win the Nordic combined event at the Holmenkollen ski festival.

References

External links
 
  - click Vinnere for downloadable pdf file 
 

1934 births
1991 deaths
Holmenkollen Ski Festival winners
Nordic combined skiers at the 1956 Winter Olympics
Nordic combined skiers at the 1960 Winter Olympics
Nordic combined skiers at the 1964 Winter Olympics
Olympic bronze medalists for the Soviet Union
Olympic Nordic combined skiers of the Soviet Union
Soviet male Nordic combined skiers
Russian male Nordic combined skiers
Armed Forces sports society athletes
Olympic medalists in Nordic combined
Medalists at the 1960 Winter Olympics